IRG may stand for:

 IATA airport code for Lockhart River Airport
 Ideographic Research Group on coded Han character sets
 Intelligent Robotics Group
 International Resources Group, a professional services firm 
 Iranian Revolutionary Guard
 International Ratings Group, a credit ratings agency
 Interest rate guarantee, a financial instrument
 Island Reggae Greats
 Immunity Related Guanosine Triphosphatases (IRGs)

See also
 Satellite IRG, the Satellite Interference Reduction Group